Chhajwali is a town of the India.

References

Cities and towns in Mandi district
Villages in Mandi tehsil